Nathan Vaught (died 1880) was a builder in Tennessee who was responsible for several noteworthy buildings.

A "master builder" from Maury County, Vaught was responsible for construction of The Athenaeum in Columbia, Tennessee.  One of his works, Walnut Grove, in Mt. Pleasant, Tennessee, is a Greek Revival style building that was built in 1858. He built antebellum homes and some commercial structures.  Many of his works are listed on the U.S. National Register of Historic Places.  He died April 9, 1880 and is buried in Rose Hill Cemetery, in Columbia, Tennessee.

Works include:
One or more works within Ashwood Rural Historic District, which spans US 43 between Columbia and Mount Pleasant, Columbia, TN, NRHP-listed
The Athenaeum, 808 Athenaeum St., Columbia, TN, NRHP-listed
Clifton Place, SW of Columbia on Mt. Pleasant Hwy., Columbia, TN, NRHP-listed
Columbia West End Historic District, Roughly along W. Seventh St. between Frierson St. and the Seaboard System RR, Columbia, TN, NRHP-listed
Elm Springs, Mooresville Pike, Columbia, TN, NRHP-listed
Fairmont, Mooresville Pike, Columbia, TN, NRHP-listed
Hamilton Place, Mt. Pleasant Pike, W of Columbia off U.S. 43, Columbia, TN, NRHP-listed
Pillow Place, Campbellsville Pike, Columbia, TN, NRHP-listed
Pillow-Bethel House, SW of Columbia off U.S. 43, Columbia, TN, NRHP-listed
Marymont Mansion 1124 Rucker Lane, Murfreesboro, TN NRHP-Listed
State Bank of Tennessee, 201 W. 7th St., Columbia, TN, NRHP-listed
Absalom Thompson House, S of Spring Hill on Denning Rd, Spring Hill, TN, NRHP-listed
Walnut Grove, 510 N. Main St., Mt. Pleasant, TN, NRHP-listed
Beechwood Manor, Carters Creek Pike, Columbia, TN

References 

People from Maury County, Tennessee
1880 deaths
Year of birth missing